Shesh Paul Vaid also known as S. P. Vaid, is an Indian police officer and former Director General of Police (DGP) of Jammu & Kashmir from 31 December 2016 till 6 September 2018.

Early life
Vaid was born and raised in the Mahanpur town of Kathua district in the Jammu Division of the erstwhile Indian state of Jammu and Kashmir in 1959 into an ethnic Dogra family. Vaid graduated in Veterinary Science (B.V.Sc) from Madras Veterinary College in the Vepery neighbourhood of Chennai, Tamil Nadu and then from the Sardar Vallabhbhai Patel National Police Academy in Hyderabad, Andhra Pradesh. He qualified for the Civil Services and was allotted the Indian Police Service (IPS) on 25 August 1986 with Jammu and Kashmir cadre.

Career
From 1988 to 1990, he was the Additional Superintendent of Police in Badgam and was promoted as Superintendent in the same district in 1990, the year when he faced maximum militant attacks. He also topped the International Commanders' programme at Police staff College at UK.

In the course of his career, he has served as Deputy Inspector General of Police of Jammu, as Inspector General (Crime), IGP (Home Guards and Civil Defence), as Inspector General Modernisation Police Headquarters, as Inspector General of Police of Jammu, as IGP Crime and Railways (2008) and Inspector General of Police (IGP) Traffic Jammu & Kashmir. In 2009, he was sent on deputation to Bureau of Police Research and Development(BPR&D) in New Delhi where he was initially posted as Director of Special Policing, then as Director of Training and in the last few months of his deputation as the Director of Administration.

In February 2010, Dr. S P Vaid was also appointed as the new Secretary of Central Indian Police Service Association (CIPSA) as an additional central charge besides his assignment in Bureau of Police Research & Development.

in June 2011, Dr Vaid was promoted to the senior Indian police rank of Additional Director General of Police. Consequently, he returned to his parent cadre in September 2011and in November 2011, the J&K State Cabinet ordered the posting of Vaid as Additional Director General of Police (ADGP), Headquarters (PHQ).

On 3 March 2016, Vaid was promoted to the grade of Director General (DG), and was subsequently appointed as Director General of Police (Prisons). On 8 September 2016, Vaid was transferred and posted as Special DG (Coordination and Law & Order). The post of Special D.G Coordination held by S.K Mishra had been re-designated as Special DG (Coordination and Law & Order) till held by the officer.

On 28 December 2016, The State Cabinet confirmed the name of S.P. Vaid as new Director General of Police (DGP) of Jammu and Kashmir Police. The decision was taken in the State Cabinet meeting headed by Chief Minister Mehbooba Mufti in Jammu. On 31 December 2016, Vaid took over the charge of Director General of Police from K. Rajendra Kumar.

Notable contributions to law and order in Kashmir
Vaid has played a role in many notable events in the state and made attempts to facilitate the improvement of law and order and police-community relations. 
 In December 1999 Vaid supervised the release from Kot Bhalwal jail of Pakistani mujaheddin leader and the founder of the militant group Jaish-e-Mohammed, Azhar Masood, who was exchanged for passengers on the hijacked Indian Airlines Flight 814 (IC-814).
On January 29, 2002, there was a specific information that a group of Al-Badr militants were waiting for other terrorist associates to conduct a meeting to plan subversive activities in Srinagar. Vaid, then DIG of Police Range Srinagar planned a joint operation along with BSF and J&K Police SOG to apprehend the militants. The same night Vaid got the area cordoned off with the help of BSF/SOG and local police so as to ensure that militants do not escape during night taking the advantage of darkness. The held up militants tried to take the BSF personnel hostage who were trapped inside but an assault was launched by Vaid along with other officers and in the process managed to rescue one BSF Jawan. In an official statement from the President's Secretariat, the President of India awarded Vaid the President's Police Medal for gallantry:
In August 2006 the Indo-Asian News Service (IANS) reported about Vaid's involvement in a project with state-owned Bharat Petroleum to employ family members of the approximately 1,000 Jammu and Kashmir policemen who have died fighting separatists.
In December 2006, as IGP Jammu, Vaid supervised the operation against the militants and regained control of the Kot Bhalwal prison following seven-hour clashes with more than 300 prisoners after the situation within the jail went out of control.
Vaid served as a chairman of the session, "Regional Cooperation to Fight Terrorism", at the March 2009 Asia Pacific Regional Conference of The World Federation of United Nations Associations.
In December 2011, Vaid inaugurated 2nd Police Martyr's Memorial North Zone Inter Club T-20 Cricket Championship 2011–12 in Kathua district of J&K. This tournament is said to have served the dual purpose of better Police-Public relations and honour to Martyr's families.
In the Burhan aftermath of the killing of Hizbul Mujahideen Commander, Burhan Wani in 2016, law and order situation in the Valley had spiralled out of control and the state government, while taking a serious note of it, shifted Vaid from the position of DG (prisons) and to Special DG (Law and order). After taking over the charge, Vaid camped in the Kashmir region and initiated various measures to make optimum use of the force so as to check rising casualties of both civilians and security forces through police-public interaction programmes in almost all districts of the Valley. Vaid has been credited for playing an important role in restoring peace and normalcy in the valley.

Assassination attempts
While Deputy Inspector General of Police, Baramulla range in the Kashmir Valley, Vaid suffered a severe hand injury in March 1999 when 25 militants ambushed his car and two escort gypsies on the national highway, on his way to Baramulla after a review meeting at Srinagar where he was officiating as Inspector General. The militants, aware that his car was bullet-proof, hurled hand-grenades and used powerful universal machine guns which pierce through bullet-proof glass, instead of the commonly used AK-47s.

In 1990, while Superintendent in Badgam, Vaid was accompanying his wife along with their month-old daughter from Gulmarg to Badgam. Militants attacked the convoy killing two army men in the vehicle in front of his car. The apprehended militants later admitted that the attack was meant to assassinate him.

Positions held

See also

Burhan aftermath
Bureau of Police Research and Development
Indian Airlines Flight 814
Insurgency in Jammu and Kashmir
Indian Police
Jammu & Kashmir Police
List of people from Jammu and Kashmir

References

Living people
Dogra people
People from Jammu and Kashmir
Indian civil servants
1959 births
Indian Hindus
Indian Police Service officers
People from Kathua district